Reccared II (in Spanish, Galician and Portuguese, Recaredo), (? – March 621) was Visigothic King of Hispania, Septimania and Galicia briefly in 621, though the length of the reign exactly is debated to last from several days to just over a year.

Biography
His father and predecessor was Sisebut. He was but a child when placed on the throne and as with most Visigothic attempts to establish a royal dynasty, Sisebut's was opposed by the nobility and ultimately failed.

His death allowed his strongman and general Suintila, to accede to the throne.

References

Sources
 Collins, Roger (2004). Visigothic Spain, 409–711. Blackwell Publishing.
 Thompson, Edward Arthur (1969). The Goths in Spain. Oxford: Clarendon Press.

7th-century Visigothic monarchs
Monarchs who died as children
Medieval child monarchs
621 deaths
Year of birth unknown